Bonto Lojong is a village in Uluere district, Bantaeng Regency in South Sulawesi province. Its population is 2719.

Climate
Bonto Lojong has a subtropical highland climate (Cfb) with moderate rainfall in August and September and heavy to very heavy rainfall in the remaining months with extremely heavy rainfall in January. It is the wettest place in Sulawesi island and the high rainfall is due to orographic lift.

References

Villages in South Sulawesi